A Belarusian passport is issued to citizens of Belarus and is used for both external and internal travel. Unlike Russia, there are no internal passports in Belarus. Passports are issued by the Ministry of Internal Affairs in Belarus and by the Ministry of Foreign Affairs to citizens who live abroad.

"AB" series passports are assigned to Brest Voblast,
"BM" series passports - Vitsebsk Voblast,
"HB" series passports - Homel Voblast,
"KH" series passports - Hrodna Voblast,
"MP" series passports - Minsk city,
"MC" series passports - Minsk Voblast,
"KB" series passports - Mahilyow Voblast,
"PP" series passports are assigned to the Ministry of Foreign Affairs.

Passports can be issued to citizens at any age. Upon turning 14, every citizen is encouraged to obtain a passport. Belarusian passports have blue covers.

Article 14 of the "Treaty on the Union between Belarus and Russia" expects the future introduction of identity documents of the Union State.

History
Until Belarus established its independence, Soviet passports were used. In spite of the fact that  Byelorussian SSR citizenship (like citizenship of all other soviet republics) was recognised by the USSR, Soviet passports never mentioned Byelorussian SSR citizenship. Soviet passports issued by the Ministry of Internal Affairs in the Byelorussian SSR (as well as birth certificates) had records in both Belarusian and Russian.

Information
A Belarusian passport contains the following information, printed in Belarusian, Russian and English:

 Given name, surname and patronymic name (the latter only in Belarusian and Russian)
 Date of birth
 Identification number
 Sex
 Place of birth 
 Date of issue
 Date of expiry
 Authority 
 Holder's signature
 Signature of the authority issuing the Passport
 Code of issuing state (BLR)
 Official seal 
 Place of residence
 Visas (if any)
 Consular stamps (for those who live abroad)
 Information about children under 16 (if any)
 Information regarding marital status and the spouse's details (if any)

Moving abroad permission stamps
Before 1 January 2008, Belarusian citizens had to apply for permission stamps in their passports in order to cross Belarusian borders. Permission stamps were given if there were no specific legal restrictions for their moving abroad.

In 2002, the Constitutional Court of Belarus stated in its decision that permission stamps were not constitutional. The Council of Ministers was ordered to propose a different kind of a citizen border control by 31 December 2005.

By a Presidential decree issued on 17 December 2007, permission stamps were finally abolished.

Visa requirements

As of 11 January 2022, Belarusian citizens had visa-free or visa on arrival access to 79 countries and territories, ranking the Belarusian passport 65th in terms of travel freedom according to the Henley Passport Index.

See also
 Belarusian citizenship
 Visa policy of Belarus
 Visa requirements for Belarusian citizens

External links

Government page with comments on visa regime with other countries

References

Belarus
Passport